This Is Not A Theatre Company (TINATC) is an American immersive theater company founded in 2013 by director Erin B. Mee and playwright Jessie Bear. In 2021, Jonathan Mandell writing of TDF listed the company one of the "5 Immersive Theatre Companies To Know".

Productions

Pool Play (2014) and Pool Play 2.0 (2017)
Set in the pool of Manhattan's Waterside Swim and Fitness Center, the company's inaugural production Pool Play (2014) explored America's long, complicated relationship with the swimming pool. The play was conceived and structured by Erin B. Mee with text by Charles Mee, Jessie Bear, and Jeanine Abraham. According to Sarah Lucie of Show Business Weekly, "The entirety of the play is well executed, featuring a strong ensemble that has absolutely no fear of diving into whatever quirky material is presented to them. Their playfulness is contagious, ultimately creating an uplifting theatrical experience that leaves the audience joyous and refreshed—and maybe a little wet. Pool Play, while undeniably light-hearted, manages to communicate some profound and political themes to those who choose to pay attention." Theatre is Easy wrote: "Pool Play...is definitely worth the trip...The entire ensemble showed moments of skill, wit, and brevity far beyond their years. Erin B. Mee does a superb job directing this young group of artists to create a cohesive look at our fascination with the water, entertaining and engaging the audience along the way." Time Outs Helen Shaw wrote: "A bathing-suited cast frolics in the blue as the audience [...] dangles its legs in the shallow end. The actors twinkle emphatically through Jessie Bear's quick-fire collage-text: reminiscences about bathtub splashing, a portrait of a segregated municipal pool, a trio of breaststrokers tussling with coaches." An interview with Erin B. Mee about Pool Play was published in "New York Theatre".

In 2017, the company revisited the project with Pool Play 2.0, an updated version featuring new cast members, adapted text by Bear and Mee, and water ballet sequences by choreographer Jonathan Matthews. Pool Play 2.0 debuted on February 24, 2017 at the International Theatre Festival of Kerala, India, and returned to Waterside Swim and Fitness for a U.S. run from March 10-April 8, 2017. Listed as a March 2017 "Voice Choice," Village Voice writer Nicole Serratore praised the show's ability to find "the outfit embedding a political intensity beneath a layer of outward frivolity." The play received critical acclaim for its theatrical ingenuity, lauded by The New York Times' Laura Collins-Hughes as a "buoyant daydream of a show;"  OffOffOnline's Chloe Edmonson as "a treasure trove of off-off-Broadway creativity," and New York Theatre Review'''s Lisa Huberman  as "daffy, thought-provoking, and splashing good fun." Matthews' choreography also received attention from the dance world: Dance Enthusiast praised the "depth and substance" beneath its "light and accessible surface." Mee discussed the project's years-long journey on the March 23, 2017 "Go See a Show!" podcast.

Happenings
On April 20, 2014, This Is Not A Theatre Company restaged two of Allen Kaprow's Happenings as part of the exhibit "Allen Kaprow. Other Ways" at the Fundacio Antoni Tapies in Barcelona.

A Serious BanquetA Serious Banquet (Judson Church, June 2014) was a theatre-dance-dinner structured around the party Pablo Picasso threw for the painter Henri Rousseau in 1908 as recorded by Gertrude Stein in The Autobiography of Alice B. Toklas by Gertrude Stein. A Serious Banquet did not have a story; there was no climactic event. It was a party. The audience entered, engaged with a number of different people and things, and experienced the world "cubistically."

According to critic Wesley Doucette: "Celebration is a sensorial experience. As is art. This evening is an experience, a way to discover cubist art from other vantage points, through other senses." He went on to say: "I was allowed instead to play and grapple with the work, not as a spectator but as a creator myself – not from the outside peering in, but from within itself."A Serious Banquet was heralded as a "profound immersive theatrical experience where performance and life intertwine effortlessly" (Show Business Weekly) and an "invitation to experience celebration" (NYTheater Now). Show Business Weekly said: "Collaborators Jessie Bear and Erin Mee are paving the way to a profound immersive theatrical experience where performance and life intertwine effortlessly. Let them begin again, and again, and again." New York Theatre Review said: "[A Serious Banquet] is enveloping. In many ways I felt as though I was a kid at Disney World...This is Not A Theatre Company take it upon themselves to actualize the premise of Woody Allen's Midnight in Paris in a fantastic fury of red wine, soft cheeses and broadly characterized homage. They create an evening of boundless fun." NYTheatreNow said: "This 'play' isn't a play at all. It is an invitation to experience celebration. Yes, it is about art and history, but these things were not handed to me in a dusty book, or put upon the stage where it could judge me for not knowing enough. I was allowed instead to play and grapple with the work, not as a spectator but as a creator myself - not from the outside peering in, but from within itself. http://nytheaternow.com/2014/06/10/a-serious-banquet/ Theatre Is Easy said: " ... exciting and innovative ... A Serious Banquet is definitely a dinner party that will leave a positive taste in your mouth and you will be more than satisfied you attended." Finally, Jon Sobel of BlogCritics wrote: "This is Not A Theatre Company" reflects Erin B. Mee and Jessie Bear's immersive-theater vision, which is realized with gusto in A Serious Banquet. Their new show/dinner party riffs lushly on a birthday party given by Pablo Picasso in his Paris studio for Henri Rousseau in 1908."

Readymade CabaretReadymade Cabaret was a participatory work of participatory theater conceived and directed by Erin B. Mee, which opened in Spring 2015 at Judson Church in New York City, and later at the 2015 Figment Festival. The show took place in a gallery of readymade art modeled after the work of Marcel Duchamp, and was structured by dice rolls made during each performance. Titles for the twenty-eight possible scenes were listed on a wall of the gallery, and the number rolled by an audience member would prompt an actor to count down the list and announce a scene title. The company would then dismantle the gallery's artworks for use as props, perform the designated scene, and repeat the process. Twenty one of the twenty-eight possible scenes were performed during each show - which meant that individual audience members saw one of over a million possible performances. Some scenes were written by playwright Jessie Bear, one was an aleatory vocal composition, one was an adaptation of John Cage's 4;33", one was an abstract dance.

The structure of the show was conceived as an experiment in the application of Dadaist and Futurist principles to theatre: what would "readymade theatre" be? A variety of pieces were exhibited as part of the gallery, including found objects, collages and architectural features of the room itself. Several art pieces created by Sam Silbiger were then featured as 'scenes' in their own right, as a reference to Dada's tendency to offend traditional artistic sensibilities (in this case, the viewer's expectation for a dramatic presentation), and focus on irrationality. Audience members were also asked to participate in the creation of a Dada Poem according to the instructions  set out by Dadaist artist Tristan Tzara. The show's dependency on the audience's active participation in dice rolling alludes to the Futurist [sic] desire to, as described by author Hans-Thies Lehmann, create theatrical events which necessarily implicated audiences in their creation, rather than simply present free-standing 'works' in which the audience had no real stake.Readymade Cabaret also included works dubbed 'tweet dances.' These were short, improvised dance pieces based on prompts given to the company via the social media site Twitter, and set to a piece of music chosen at random from a list of recordings in the public domain.

The production was favorably reviewed by several notable online journals, including Theater is Easy, Eye on Dance, and Culturebot.

Ferry PlayFerry Play is a site-specific smartphone play for the Staten Island Ferry. As the ferry sets sail, audience members put their earbuds in place and listen to a recorded production in which every surrounding sight, smell and sound plays a supporting role in the experience. "Ferry Play's" creation stemmed from Mee's fascination with downloadable audio-dramas known as podplays or "smartphone plays." "Smartphone plays," Mee elaborates in a HowlRound article, "are an emerging genre of theatre that take advantage of mobile technology to create site-specific audio-based theatrical experiences." "In most cases, the audience downloads an audio file onto an iPod, smartphone, or other mobile listening device, proceeds to a particular location, and presses play. One of the defining characteristics of a smartphone play—in contradistinction to a radio play, podcast, audio tour, or sound installation—is that the best smartphone plays juxtapose the intimacy of the dialogue spoken right into your ear with the vastness of the site you inhabit to create a unique theatrical experience […] Counterintuitively, smartphone plays use technology to get away from technology by inviting you to notice the world around you instead of walking through it while glued to the texts on your smartphone screen." Mee and Bear also wanted to explore "the characters that ride the ferry every day - and the plays you can overhear by listening to other people's conversations."

"Ferry Play creates a dynamic relationship between the recording (which never changes) and a site that is constantly changing. The view of and from the ferry is radically different on a warm sunny Sunday than it is during a snowstorm, at sunset, or during a morning commute. If your ferry has a snack bar—and if the snack bar is open—you can smell popcorn and hotdogs; if it isn't, you can't. Most significantly, the characters in the play change based on who is riding the ferry with the audience and what they are talking about. At the beginning of the play, a teenager looks around and says to her family: "look at that creepy guy over there." Every time an audience member actually looks, there will be someone different to see: if the audience member sees someone they perceive as creepy, then they share the same perception; if there is a guy who doesn't seem creepy to the listener, then the listener might decide the teen is judgmental; if there is no one at all, we begin to wonder if she is imagining things, or if this is a game she plays with her family."Ferry Play is a self-scheduled performance: audiences can ride the ferry late at night, early morning, or any time in between—they choose the day and time, which then affects the experience they have. Ferry Play has two acts: the first act takes place on the ride from Manhattan to Staten Island; the second act takes place on the ride from Staten Island to Manhattan. Act Two can be experienced right after Act One, or hours, days, or months later.

According to Michael Niederman of New York Theatre Review, "the revelatory thing about Ferry Play [is that it] encourages the listener to see a familiar part of the world in a whole new way," .

Lauren Steussy describes the experience: "It was not quiet on the set of "Ferry Play" when the show began. Dozens of tourists pushed to find their places, positioning their cell phones and cameras to the front, yelling at one another in different languages to come closer, stepping on toes and uttering insincere apologies. The set was the Staten Island Ferry and I was listening through my earphones. "Ferry Play" is a new site-specific play written by Jessie Bear and directed and conceived by Erin Mee. It can be downloaded to any iPhone or Android smartphone and listened to on the ferry, preferably the upper decks on a nice day […] The play begins with much of the same scene that's happening before us in real time. Tourists clamoring for the best backdrop to their vacation photos, a harried mom quieting a whiny child, a beer can cracking open. Woven through these natural sounds and bits and pieces of stories, two main characters reflect on what's really happening when everyone boards. "They like to capture things on screens," a character named April says, almost as if whispering in your ear. "Take pictures. I guess to prove you were somewhere. You really, really were somewhere. I just find — the more images we capture, the less we actually see. Maybe."

As Eliza Bent points out in her article "There's A Play Happening on the Staten Island Ferry", Ferry Play raises questions about what a play is, who the audience is, what the set is, and even what is real and what is not: "Is a play still a play when the actors aren't aware they're actors? Is a spectator still a spectator when they become a part of a set?" she asks.

Because it can be done at any time of day, any day of the week, any time of the year; because you don't have to wear anything special, and because it only costs $1.99 to download the play from the apple or android app store, Erin Mee writes that Ferry Play has attracted a diverse audience: "When I was handing out flyers at Whitehall Terminal, I tried to anticipate who might be interested, but I was always wrong. People with green hair and white hair were interested; a five year old with pink barrettes and a gentleman in his 80s; people carrying guitars, people carrying briefcases, people dressed in hospital scrubs, people pushing strollers; people of all ages, races, incomes, and dress styles. Some were actors themselves; others were people who have never been to the theatre before. One young man offered to write a sequel; another woman told me she didn't own a smartphone but would listen to it on her computer. The only "demographic" that wasn't interested was the "I'm-late-and-I'm-afraid-I'm-going-to-miss-the-ferry" demographic. Otherwise, it was impossible to make any kind of generalization. Most ferry riders were hungry for a theatrical experience (except the guy who thought it was for tourists, and informed me, in no uncertain terms, that he was not a tourist)."

In summer 2015 Ferry Play was chosen to be included in FringeNYC's Fringe ALFresco series of free-and-cheap outdoor performances.Ferry Play has been profiled in American Theatre Magazine and the Wall Street Journal. The theatre company's website has an excerpt of the play, as well as link to two podcasts.

"If nothing else, the play is something to occupy what has probably become a mundane trip for many commuters, and for tourists in the city, one of too many attractions to consume. But if anything else, it's a reminder of the sheer amount of humanity crammed into one small space...And on those nights or mornings when a good mood strikes and the skyline looks particularly beautiful, it's nice to be reminded of where in the world we are" writes Lauren Steussy.Ferry Play was conceived and directed by Erin B. Mee, and written by Jessie Bear. Sound Design by Matthew Wilson. Cast: Stephen Bennett, J. Stephen Brantley, Lindsay Bregenzer, Isabel Bregenzer, Emily Cordes, Ratnesh Dubey, Caitlin Goldie, Ali Kennedy Scott, Daniel Leeman Smith, Gabriela Agape, Lily Narbonne, Clara Pagone, Leila Satyanath-Mee, Mirelly Vargas, and Tom Nellis of Broadway's "The Visit."

Versailles 2015/2016
Set against a backdrop of global crisis, the characters of Versailles 2015 questioned the responsibilities and obligations of their privilege at a cocktail party set in an actual New York City apartment. Guests rotated through the space's five rooms, discussing gentrification over hors d'oeuvres in the living room and dietary privilege over cake in the kitchen, witnessing scenes of social alienation and existential conflict in the bedroom and guest bathroom, and viewing dancer Jonathan Matthews' performance in the master bathroom's tub. Versailles 2015 originally took place in an apartment in Manhattan's Peter Cooper Village, with textual references to the neighborhood's history and building complex's evolution. In February 2016, the show was picked up by En Garde Arts, and given an additional run at the home of founder Anne Hamburger in Hastings-on-Hudson. Versailles returned to New York City in October–November 2016, appearing in select apartments throughout Manhattan and Brooklyn. Each successive performance received textual changes referencing its location's history and socioeconomic climate.New York Theatre Review said, "Versailles 2015 is over far too quickly. It is an hors d'oeuvre plate of scenes that collectively have a message about elitism and the vanity of apathy...Brief and poignant, Versailles 2015 will linger in your mind long after you see it."Culturebot said: "The underlying theme of the evening…is that we, here, at this party, are in fact living a better, richer, more luxurious life than Louis XVI did.  And that, um, maybe that's not necessarily a good thing?  But even though we feel so guilty sometimes about having so much privilege, it still beats the alternative, right? The overall tone, to the credit of director Erin B. Mee, helps the show maintain a sort of 'whistling past the guillotine' balance between the obvious (yeah, we're privileged, so what) and the unsettling (but we – us in this room – not just the bankers – are actually living the kind of life that can bring about a revolution from its underclass, which should perhaps cause us more concern than it does).  For me, the second point was the more interesting one – I tend to carefully position myself, within the spectrum of overall privilege, as being one of the uprisers, not the class to be overthrown.  Arguments I might make to help me defend that position include pointing out that I'm poor (but one can argue that I chose the poverty of an artist, which in a way is one of the most privileged acts one can undertake – a genuine pursuit of what you think makes you happy), and my being from the farflung Midwest as opposed to being part of the uber-connected East Coast pipeline of influence.  But, even with my relatively meager artist's income, I'm still – according to data presented to me over cake in the kitchen – in the top one percent of income worldwide.  So, um, still Versailles."Theatre Is Easy called Versailles 2015 "delightful and provocative:" "One of the great things about any immersive theatre experience is that it immediately throws you into a situation where your senses are heightened and every experience is suddenly called into question—is that part of the show? Is that an actor? Is that supposed to be happening? This Is Not a Theatre Company's (TINATC) new production, Versailles 2015, does exactly this in a delightful and provocative manner."

The dance in the bathtub, choreographed by Jonathan Matthews, was described as "a perfectly abstracted restatement of all the content that surrounds it.  Wordlessly, tuxedo-bound, Mr. Matthews sprays himself with disturbing amounts of body spray while he dances a miniature tour around the edge of the tub, turning it effectively into an abyss of guilt, vapidity, and – in spite of all that privilege – inexplicable unfulfillment" The dance was particularly well received by Courtney Escoyne, who wrote: "Versailles 2015 made me think. It blurred the lines between audience and performer, ignored entirely the idea of a fourth wall, and managed to fit in some wonderfully crafted dialogue without...losing its connection to reality."The New York Times feature "Starring Me! A Surreal Dive Into Immersive Theater" referenced Versailles 2016 as an example of the genre, and Mee's March 2016 HowlRound.com article used the show to illuminate the challenges of stage managing immersive productions.

Café Play 2017/2018
In 2017, This Is Not A Theatre Company premiered their new show: Café Play. Café Play transformed The Cornelia Street Café—in Greenwich Village—into an immersive and interactive wonderland. Offering a unique glimpse into the lives of New Yorkers – from the waitress to the cockroach to the teacup on the table – Café Play ran the gamut from the hilarious to the profound and transformative. Audiences enjoyed a three-course dinner during the show and fully immersed themselves in the world of the café. Café Play was conceived and directed by Erin B. Mee, written by Jenny Lyn Bader, Jessie Bear, Erin B. Mee, and Colin Waitt, and included choreography by Jonathan Matthews.

The show was remounted in 2018 with some edits. A new character was added: a teacup voiced by the award-winning actress Kathleen Chalfant.

Play!Play!'' (Co-created by Charles Mee, Erin Mee, Ezra Brain, and Jonathan Matthews. Directed by Erin Mee and Choreographed & Performed by Jonathan Matthews)  had its first run in September 2019 at Theatre Lab in NYC. "Play!" explores dance, the rules that govern human society, capitalism, baby pools, trees, and what it means to live morally in the modern world.

In an interview between Johnathan Matthews and Jonathan Mandell, Matthews summed up the piece, saying "“Everything I do up [until the end] is just rhetorical preamble. The dancing at the end with the audience is the piece”

Theatre in the Dark: Carpe Diem

TNATC hosted performances of Theatre In The Dark: Carpe Diem, a multi-sensory theatre piece with food that takes place entirely in the dark. Audiences smelled, tasted, and touched their way through this nourishing ode to joy, and let it awaken their autonomous sensory meridian responses. Theatre in The Dark" Carpe Diem was presented in rep with Play! at Theatre Lab in NYC, starting September 2019. Company member Ezra Brain wrote about the process of making this piece for Howlround. Writing for Theatre is Easy, Asya Gorovits said that the "surrendering [of] the narrative puts the 'spectator' in the dark, allowing for a new kind of theatre, one with its own strange and beautiful logic."

TINATC revived Theatre in the Dark for a special Winter Solstice and Valentine's Day productions.

Projects Online

Following the Covid-19 related shutdown of theaters in the U.S., TINATC began to develop plays specifically for the virtual space.

Tree Confessions
Trees talk! In a landmark study, a scientist learned everything about how trees communicate. — Or did she? One tree tells the story of what really happened, reminding us that human beings and plants live in one interconnected ecosystem. Presenting the world’s first play told entirely from the point of view of a tree. To experience this site-specific audio play, find a tree near you, sit under it (or nearby), press play, and listen to the tree’s confessions.
Tree Confessions premiered in the “Beuys for Future” international exhibit at the Gallery for Sustainable Art in Berlin, and then went on to the Brighton, Philadelphia, Melbourne, and Camden Fringe festivals, where it has received rave reviews. “Moving and powerful” says Ramsay Adams, Executive Director of Catskill Mountainkeepers. Tree Confessions is a site-specific audio play with a 35 minute duration, and production in 2021.
Tree Confessions is written by Jenny Lyn Bader, directed by Erin B. Mee, and stars Tony-nominated and Obie-award winning actress Kathleen Chalfant in the title role. It is one of TINATC’s Play(s) At Home series, featuring site-specific audio plays for the kitchen, livingroom, bathroom, closet, and dining room by playwrights from India, the West Bank, Argentina, and the United States, as well as plays about homelessness and the refugee experience.

Play In Your Bathtub

Light a candle, draw a bath, and relax with this immersive audio spa for social distancing. Play in Your Bathtub has been experienced in over 34 countries, translated into Russian and Argentinian Spanish (Una Obra En Tu Bañera), and was a part of the 2020 Online@theSpaceUK festival. "Play In Your Bathtub" was written up by the Theatre Times, the New York Times, and Time Out New York. Director Erin Mee also appeared on Go See a Show to discuss "Play In Your Bathtub".

Play In Your Bathtub 2.0 is the English translated version of Play In Your Bathtub, premiering in April 2020. Play In Your Bathtub participated in the Edinburgh Festival, and was presented in Moscow by Theatre WOWWOWWOW. The Spanish version (Una Obra En Tu Bañera) has been adapted to include poetry by Juan L. Ortiz, original piano music composed especially for this version, and other new elements. Play In Your Bathtub received reviews and mentions in numerous publications, including The New York Times, The Guardian, Time Out New York, The Theatre Times and other publications in the U.S.A. and the United Kingdom.

Life on Earth

Life on Earth is an online, durational, participatory adaptation of Charles Mee's Heaven on Earth performed entirely on Discord. It can still be experienced.

References

Theatre companies in New York City
2013 establishments in New York City